Dave Jenks (July 9, 1942 – September 14, 2021) was an American author and business person.

In 2003, with the release of The Millionaire Real Estate Agent, co-authored by Gary Keller and Jay Papasan, Jenks became a best-selling author when the book spent time on BusinessWeek's best-seller list. In 2005, they co-authored their second book, The Millionaire Real Estate Investor, which reached The New York Times best-seller list, as well as BusinessWeek's best-seller list.

History
Prior to joining Keller Williams in 1996, Jenks was president and CEO of Century 21 South Central States, based in Dallas, Texas. Jenks has been in the real estate industry since 1981, has taught for the Dale Carnegie Institute, and owned his own training company, The Leadership Connection Inc.

Jenks died on September 14, 2021, after filing a do not resuscitate order. He had been suffering from a melanoma and COVID-19 when he died.

References

1942 births
2021 deaths
American businesspeople
American business writers
American business theorists
Colgate University alumni
Michigan State University alumni
University at Albany, SUNY alumni
People from Lockport, New York